Graham Charles Savory (born 1960), is a male former athlete who competed for England.

Athletics career
Savory was twice British champion after winning the 1986 UK Athletics Championships and 1989 UK Athletics Championships in the discus. He was also twice a silver medal winner at the AAA Championships.

He represented England in the discus and shot put events, at the 1986 Commonwealth Games in Edinburgh, Scotland. Four years later he represented England in the discus event, at the 1990 Commonwealth Games in Auckland, New Zealand.

References

1960 births
Living people
Athletes (track and field) at the 1986 Commonwealth Games
British male shot putters
English male shot putters
English male discus throwers
British male discus throwers
Commonwealth Games competitors for England